The following is a list of massacres that have been occurred in the territory of today's Slovakia (numbers may be approximate):

See also
Crime in Slovakia
List of massacres in the Czech Republic

References

Slovakia
Massacres

Massacres